Babubarhi Assembly constituency is an assembly constituency in Madhubani district in the Indian state of Bihar.

Overview
As per Delimitation of Parliamentary and Assembly constituencies Order, 2008, No. 34  Babubarhi Assembly constituency is composed of the following: Babubarhi and  Ladania community development blocks; Sukki, Kanhauli, Bhakua, Chandardih, Inarwa, Chandargobraura North and Chandargobraura South gram panchayats of Khajauli CD Block.

Babubarhi Assembly constituency is part of No. 7 Jhanjharpur (Lok Sabha constituency).

Members of Legislative Assembly

Election results

2020

References

External links
 

Assembly constituencies of Bihar
Politics of Madhubani district